Zygadenia is an extinct genus of beetles in the family Ommatidae.

Triassic Species 
After Kirejtshuk, 2020. Kirejtshuk notes that the two Lower Jurassic Australian species Z. westraliensis and Z. martinae possibly merit placement in their own separate genus.

Ladinian (242 Ma to ~237 Ma)
 Tongchuan Formation, China
 Z. shiluoensis

Carnian (237 Ma to 227 Ma)
Koldzat Formation, Kazakhstan
 Z. oxypygus 
Madygen Formation, Kyrgyzstan
 Z. laticella 
 Z. rostratus  
 Z. tenuis

Jurassic species

Hettangian (201.3 Ma to 199.3 Ma)
Dzhil Formation, Kyrgyzstan
 Z. cellulosa  
 Z. issykkulensis 
 Z. kirghizicus 
 Z. latus 
 Z. sogutensis 
Guanyintan Formation, China
 Z. homorus

Toarcian (182.7 Ma to 174.1 Ma)
Cattamarra Coal Measures, Australia
 Z. martinae 
 Z. westraliensis 
Guanyintan Formation, China
 Z. lini 
Sulyukta Formation, Kyrgyzstan
 Z. crassus

Bajocian (170.3 Ma to 168.3 Ma)
Bakhar Formation, Mongolia
 Z. brachycephalus 
 Z. exiguus 
 Z. longicollis

Callovian (166.1 Ma to 163.5 Ma)
Haifanggou Formation, China
 Z. dischides 
 Z. jurassica 
 Z. pingi 
Tyumen Formation, Russian
 Z. patulus

Oxfordian (163.5 Ma to 157.3 Ma)
Karabastau Formation, Kazakhstan
 Z. foersteri  
 Z. lapidarius 
 Z. nigromonticola 
 Z. picturatus 
 Z. pulcher

Tithonian (152.1 Ma To 145.0 Ma)
Shar Teeg, Mongolia
 Z. brachycephalus  
 Z. exiguus 
 Z. giebeli 
 Z. handlirschi 
Solnhofen, Germany
 Z. reticulatus ) 
 Z. tripartitus

Cretaceous species

Berriasian (145.0 Ma To 139.8 Ma)
Lulworth Formation, United Kingdom
 Z. angliae 
 Z. tuberculata

Hauterivian (132.9 Ma to 129.4 Ma)
Dabeigou Formation, China
 Z. lentus 
Weald Clay, United Kingdom
 Z. angliae 
 Z. floodpagei 
 Z. simpsoni

Barremian (129.4 Ma to 125.0 Ma)
Jianshangou Formation, China
 Z. laetus 
La Huérguina Formation, Las Hoyas, Spain
 Z. diazromerali  
 Z. longicoxa   
 Z. siniestri  
 Z. viridis 
La Pedrera de Rúbies Formation, Las Hoyas, Spain 
 Z. martinclosas  
 Z. oculata 
Ulan-Argalant Formation, Mongolia
 Z. mongolicus 
Weald Clay, United Kingdom
 Z. angliae 
 Z. floodpagei 
 Z. tuberculata 
 Z. simpsoni

Aptian (125.0 to ~113.0 Ma) 
Argun Formation, Russia
 Z. semen 
 Z. sibirica 
 Z. sinitzae 
Dzun-Bain Formation, Mongolia
 Z. dundulaensis  
 Z. elegans 
Jehol Group, China
 Z. valida  
Khasurty Formation, Russia 
 Z. khasurtyiensis 
Laiyang Formation, China
 Z. laiyangensis 
 Z. ludongensis 
 Z. tuanwangensis 
Shahai Formation, China
 Z. kezuoensis 
Yixian Formation, China
 Z. aliena 
 Z. epicharis  
 Z. eumeura  
 Z. liui  
 Z. miniscula 
 Z. porrecta 
 Z. protensa  
 Z. psilata  
 Z. rudis  
 Z. stabilis  
Zaza Formation, Russia
 Z. caudatus 
 Z. excellens 
 Z. vitimensis

Turonian (93.9 to 89.8 Ma)
Emanra Formation, Russia
 Z. khetanensis  
Kzyl-Zhar Locality, Kazakhstan
 Z. caduca

References

Ommatidae
Prehistoric beetle genera